Deliverance is a 1972 film directed by John Boorman.

Deliverance may also refer to:

Arts, entertainment, and media

Film and television
 Deliverance (1919 film), a film about Helen Keller
 BloodRayne 2: Deliverance, a 2007 direct-to-video film
 Sadgati ("Salvation" or "Deliverance"), a 1981 Hindi film directed by Satyajit Ray
 "Deliverance" (Roseanne), a 1992 television episode

Music

Bands
 Deliverance (metal band), an American group
 Deliverance (rock band), a German–Canadian group

Albums
 Deliverance (Deliverance album) (1989), 
 Deliverance (Corrosion of Conformity album) (1994)
 Deliverance (Baby D album) (1996)
 Deliverance (Citizen Kane album) (1999)
 Deliverance (Joi Cardwell album) (1999)
 Deliverance (You Am I album) (2002)
 Deliverance (Opeth album) (2002)
 Deliverance (Bubba Sparxxx album) (2003)
 Deliverance (Quietdrive album) (2008)
 The Deliverance by Sway (2015)

Songs
 "Deliverance", 1984 song by Queensrÿche from The Warning
 "Deliverance", 1990 song by The Mission from Carved in Sand
 "Deliverance", 1995 song by Earth Crisis from Destroy the Machines
 "Deliverance", 2003 song by Cult of Luna from The Beyond
 Deliverance (Bubba Sparxxx song) (2003)
 Deliverance (You Am I song) (2003)
 "Deliverance", 2018 song by CHVRCHES
 "Deliverance", 2020 song by Within the Ruins from Black Heart
 "Deliverance", 1977 song by Space

Video games
 Deliverance (video game), a platformer released in 1992
 Deliverance: Stormlord II, by Hewson Consultants
 Kingdom Come: Deliverance, an open-world role-playing game

Other media
 Deliverance (novel), by James Dickey, the basis for the 1972 film
 The Deliverance, a 1904 historical novel by Ellen Glasgow
 Deliverance of Saint Peter, a 1514 painting by Raphael

Military
 Deliverance of Vienna, a 1683 defeat of the Ottoman Empire by the Holy League
 Operation Deliverance, the 1992 Canadian Forces mission in Somalia

Other uses
 Deliverance Island (Queensland), in Australia's Torres Strait
 Deliverance ministry, a type of Christian prayer

See also
Delivery (disambiguation)